21C18 British India Line is a preserved SR Merchant Navy class steam locomotive built by the Southern Railway in 1945.

British India Line was one of the first batch of twenty completed at Eastleigh Works in May 1945, and in that month was first shedded at Nine Elms shed, where it was to remain for most of its career, under both the Southern Railway and British Railways. On 24 November 1960 it was briefly re-allocated to Bournemouth's 71B shed, but in January of the following year it returned to Nine Elms 70A shed.

21C18 was withdrawn from service in August 1964 and sold on to Woodham Brothers scrapyard in Barry, South Wales where it arrived in December of the same year. It was rescued from the scrapyard in November 1979, but work to restore the locomotive began only in 2012 and British India Line ran again under its own steam on the main line in May 2017.

Allocations and history 
The shed locations of 35018 on particular dates as well as where it has been stored and based over the years in preservation.

When built in 1945 no 21C18 emerged in a streamlined condition with air-smoothed casing, all-welded firebox, a boiler pressure of 280psi, thermic siphons, chain-driven valve gear which was sealed in an oil bath, steam reverser and electric lighting for both front of engine and cab, using electricity from a steam-powered generator. Because of mechanical issues with the class, including an accident at Crewkerne in 1953 which involved 21C20 Bibby Line, it was decided to rebuild all 30 locomotives to a more conventional design. This included removing the air-smoothed casing and using instead conventional boiler cladding, reduction of boiler pressure to 250psi and replacement of the chain-driven valve gear with three sets of Walschaerts valve gear. The unique Bulleid Firth Brown wheels were retained, as well as other original parts which did work but the rebuilt engines would emerge in a completely different shape to their original form.

35018 was the first engine to be rebuilt and emerged from Eastleigh works in February 1956. Following the rebuilding of all the Merchant Navy class engines, the success of the modification programme influenced the design of the future modification of the smaller 'Light Pacifics'.

After being rebuilt, 21C18 remained in service for only eight more years until August 1964, when it was the fifth member of the class to be withdrawn. It was purchased by Barry Scrapyard for eventual disposal and arrived at Barry Island in March 1965.

Preservation
In November 1979 British India Line was purchased for preservation by Richard Heather and John Bunch, and in March 1980 the engine was moved to the Mid Hants Railway (MHR) where restoration to full running order was to take place. It had been at Barry Island for 15 years.  However, little work was undertaken on the engine during its time at the MHR and it was later moved to a site in Portland in Dorset, but following little work again being undertaken on restoring the engine it was moved once more, in 2012, to the former 10A steam shed at Carnforth, Lancashire following purchase by David Smith. It then underwent a thorough restoration to working order and modern mainline standards.

On 17 May 2017, following running in at Carnforth, 35018 ran on the national rail network for the first time since being withdrawn in August 1964. the engine bearing the nameplates of SR West Country class 4-6-2 No. 34016 Bodmin (34016 being a former MHR based engine then based at Carnforth). After light and loaded test runs earlier in the year, it was repainted from its unlined black livery into BR Brunswick Green with the late crest on its tender. 35018 hauled its first mainline train on 30 September 2017. The train was West Coast Railways' "The Lune Rivers Trust" special from Carnforth to York. It had been planned that the locomotive should work on its own from Carnforth to York and then to double head with 45699 Galatea on the return journey. However, 35018 was failed in York with mechanical problems and the tour was worked back to Carnforth by Galatea on its own.

On 23 February and 7 March 2018, 35018 went on loaded test runs but on the first test run the engine was failed at Hellifield and returned directly to Carnforth running tender first. The second test run went without any problems and the engine returned to full mainline service on 21 March 2018. Its first train was West Coast Railways' "Salopian Express 1" from Barrow to Shrewsbury with 35018 working the train from Carnforth to Shrewsbury.

On 19 March 2022, 35018 made its first trip to Edinburgh while working Railway Touring Company's "Edinburgh Flyer" from Preston to Edinburgh travelling along the West Coast Main Line via Shap and Beattock with 35018 working the train from Carnforth to Edinburgh in both directions. This trip was the engine's first visit to Scotland and the first time a merchant navy class locomotive had visited Edinburgh; none had visited when in service for British Railways and none had previously visited in preservation.

It is the third member of the class to operate on the main line in preservation, after  35005 Canadian Pacific and 35028 Clan Line.

Since returning to service the engine has made main line trips and operated on the Wensleydale heritage railway.

Photographic chronology

References

External links 
 Photographs of 35018 over the years

4-6-2 locomotives
Railway locomotives introduced in 1945
Merchant Navy 35018
Standard gauge steam locomotives of Great Britain
Streamlined steam locomotives
Locomotives saved from Woodham Brothers scrapyard